Barrais-Bussolles is a commune in the Allier department in the Auvergne-Rhône-Alpes region of central France.

The inhabitants of the commune are known as Barraisiens or Barraisiennes.

Geography
Access to the commune is by the D424 road from Andelaroche in the south-east which passes through the village and continues north to join the D124 inside the commune. The D124 comes from Bert in the north and passes through the northern part of the commune continuing south-west to Lapalisse. Apart from the village there are also the hamlets of La Tuilerie, Les Rois d'en Bas, Les Rois, Les Cinq Chênes, Les Goyards, Les Gailles, Les Desserts, La Bruyère, Le Casson, Montpertuis, Les Tixiers, Les Rigondets, Les Jayots de Bois, Les Allaisons, Mâme, and Les Rivières in the commune. The commune is mainly farmland with some forest in the south-east and north-east.

The Ris des Rois stream forms the north-western border of the commune as it flows north-west to join La Besbre near Trézelles. The Ruisseau de Conrieux forms most of the northern border of the commune as it flows east to join the Ris des Rois. The Ruisseau de l'Étang Cochon also rises in the north of the commune and flows north-east to join the Ris des Rois. On the western border the Ruisseau de Gerban forms the border as it flows south-west to join La Petit Tèche which continues to join La Besbre north of Lapalisse. The Ruisseau de Maupas forms the southern border of the commune as it flows east to join La Petit Tèche. The Ruisseau de Saint-Pourçain forms part of the eastern border as it flows north to join the Ruisseau des Gouttes Barres which in turn forms the north-eastern border as it flows north to join La Tèche near Bert.

History
Barrais appears as Barrois on the 1750 Cassini Map and the same on the 1790 version.

Bussolles appears as Bufsolles on the 1750 Cassini Map and as Bussoles on the 1790 version.

The commune was formed in 1833 by the merger of the communes of Barrais and Bussolles.

Heraldry

Administration

List of Successive Mayors

The Municipal Council is composed of 11 members including the Mayor and 2 deputies.

Demography
In 2017 the commune had 192 inhabitants.

Culture and heritage

Religious heritage
The Chapel de la Tour Pourçain (13th century) is registered as an historical monument. It is in the Gothic style with a bell tower over a facade that was added in the 19th century with a slate roof and surmounted by a wooden arrow.

Notable people linked to the commune
André Louis Laveissière (called Kiki), born 8 August 1913 in Hautot-sur-Mer (Seine-Maritime) and died 24 November 1994 in Paris. He joined General de Gaulle in England, walking across France and later Spain. Member of the Free French Air Force, former No. 341 Squadron RAF. Chevalier of the Legion of Honour, Croix de Guerre with palm 1939–1945, Resistance Medal, Escapees' Medal, Volunteer combatant's cross, and Aeronautical Medal. He lived in the commune during part of his youth. He then lived in Boulogne-Billancourt. He is, however, buried in the cemetery of Barrais-Bussolles.

See also
Communes of the Allier department

References

Communes of Allier